Black Jack Creek is a stream in Crawford County in the U.S. state of Missouri. It is a tributary of Cherry Valley Creek.

The headwaters arise just east of Missouri Route 19 about four miles southeast of Steelville at an elevation of near 1000 feet (at )). The stream flows about two miles east to its confluence with Cherry Valley Creek at an elevation of 850 feet (at ).

Black Jack Creek most likely was named for the blackjack oak along its course.

See also
List of rivers of Missouri

References

Rivers of Crawford County, Missouri
Rivers of Missouri